Ross Young may refer to:
Ross Young (footballer), Australian rules footballer
Ross Young (politician), member of the Legislative Assembly of Prince Edward Island
Ross Young (rugby union), CEO of USA Rugby
Ross B. Young (editor), Founder of the Memphis Press (1909)

See also
Ross Young's, food company
Ross Youngs, baseball player